Michael John Murphy (born 5 May 1977) is an English former professional footballer who played in the Football League and National Conference League as a Striker, before moving to play in Scandinavia in the Finnish Veikkausliiga and Ykkonen league as a left sided midfielder and wing-back. Finishing his career in semi-professional football in the United Kingdom

External links
Profile at ENFA
Staines stats at SoccerFactsUK

1977 births
Living people
Sportspeople from Slough
English footballers
Association football midfielders
Reading F.C. players
Slough Town F.C. players
Riihimäen Palloseura players
Hyvinkään Palloseura players
Windsor & Eton F.C. players
Staines Town F.C. players
Walton & Hersham F.C. players
Ashford Town (Middlesex) F.C. players
English Football League players
Footballers from Berkshire